Hakuchi (Xakuchi; Хьакӏуцубзэ  Kh′ak′ucubză or Къарацхаибзэ Qaracxaibză in Hakuchi Adyghe) is a variety of the Shapsug sub-dialect of West Adyghe dialect of the Adyghe language spoken in Turkey.

Since the Hakuchi are considered an isolated Shapsugh clan, their dialect differs little from that of the Shapsugh dialect.

Phonology
The Hakuchi has an uvular ejective [qʼ] and a labialized uvular ejective [qʷʼ] that correspond to West Adyghe and Kabardian Adyghe glottal stop [ʔ] and labialized glottal stop [ʔʷ].

See also
 Adyghe language
 West Adyghe dialect
 Abzakh Adyghe sub-dialect
 Bzhedug Adyghe sub-dialect
 Shapsug Adyghe sub-dialect
 Ubykh Adyghe dialect
 Kabardian Adyghe dialect
 Besleney (Cherkessian) Adyghe sub-dialect

References

 John Colarusso, A grammar of the Kabardian language, University of Calgary Press, 1992, p. 2
 Henricus Joannes Smeets, Studies in West Circassian phonology and morphology, Hakuchi Press, 1984, pp. 3,361,452

Adyghe language
Endangered Caucasian languages
Languages of Turkey
Shapsugs